Michael McIntyre's Big Show (adapted from Michael McIntyre's Big Christmas Show) is a British variety and stand-up comedy television series, presented by British comedian Michael McIntyre. The show was originally a one-off Christmas special in 2015, before the BBC announced that they had ordered a full series in 2016, which started airing on 16 April of that year, and concluded on 28 May 2016.

The show features celebrity guests, musical performances, comedy sketches from McIntyre and guest comics. The show was initially recorded at the Theatre Royal Drury Lane in London. The series was well received by the public and BBC One renewed the show for a second series which began airing November 2016, concluding in a Christmas special, which was broadcast on Christmas Eve 2016.

The show was commissioned for a third series to air in 2017, which ran for 6 episodes from 18 November. The series finished with its Christmas special on Christmas Eve. It was then announced in December 2017 that the show was renewed for a fourth series that aired in 2018. A fifth series aired in 2019 and was filmed at The London Palladium. Following a break during the COVID-19 pandemic, it returned on 14 January 2023 on BBC One and iPlayer.

Items and game segments
Each episode of Michael McIntyre's Big Show includes a game segment or an item involving a celebrity or an unexpecting member of the public.

Series overview

Awards and nominations

References

External links

2015 British television series debuts
2010s British comedy television series
2020s British comedy television series
BBC high definition shows
BBC television comedy
British variety television shows
English-language television shows
Television series by Hungry Bear Media